Dadu station may refer to:

 Dadu railway station (Pakistan), on the Kotri–Attock line in Sindh
 Dadu railway station (Taichung), on the TRA West Coast line in Taiwan